The flat-headed kusimanse (Crossarchus platycephalus) is a mongoose species endemic to West African rainforests. It is listed as Least Concern on the IUCN Red List since 2008.

Distribution
The species is native to central Africa extends from southern Benin and southern Nigeria via Cameroon to the Central African Republic and the northwest of the Republic of the Congo.

Description
The species is very similar to the dark kusimanse, but differ in skull. Flat-headed kusimanse has a mane of the neck. Head to body length is 30 to 36 cm, the tail measures 16 to 21 cm. Male is slightly larger than female and the weigh about 1.5 kg. Female weighs about 0.5 kg. Body is slender and elongated with a relatively short tail and legs. There are five toes in front and rear paws with the front paws have strong claws. The dark, shaggy fur is dark brown or black in color. Dental formula is I 3/3 - C 1 / 1- P 3 / 3- M 2/2.

Ecology
Habitat is mainly the undergrowth of tropical rainforests and riparian forests. Very common in human habitations such as fields in the Niger Delta. It can be easily tamed where it is a cooperative with humans.

Very little is known about their way of life. They are probably diurnal and live in groups that roam around their territory without a fixed structure. They look for food, invertebrates and small vertebrates, on the forest floor or in rotted tree trunks.

References

flat-headed kusimanse
Mammals of West Africa
Mammals of Cameroon
flat-headed kusimanse